The 1971 Torneo Godó or Trofeo Conde de Godó was a men's tennis tournament that took place on outdoor clay courts in Barcelona, Spain. It was the 18th edition of the event and was part of the 1971 World Championship Tennis circuit, although it was also open to non-WCT players. It was held from 18 October until 24 October 1971. Manuel Orantes, an independent pro, won the singles title.

Finals

Singles
 Manuel Orantes defeated  Bob Lutz 6–4, 6–3, 6–4

Doubles
 Željko Franulović /  Juan Gisbert defeated  Cliff Drysdale /  Andrés Gimeno 7–6, 6–2, 7–6

References

External links
 ITF tournament edition details
 ATP tournament profile
 Official tournament website

Barcelona Open (tennis)
Torneo Godo
Torneo Godo
Barcelona WCT